Hurricane Javier was a powerful tropical cyclone whose remnants brought above-average rainfall totals across the western United States in September 2004. Javier was the tenth named storm, the sixth hurricane and the final major hurricane of the 2004 Pacific hurricane season. Javier was also the strongest hurricane of the 2004 season, with 150 mph (240 km/h) winds and a central pressure of 930 millibars (27.46 Hg). However, because of high wind shear in the East Pacific, Javier weakened rapidly before making landfall in Baja California as a tropical depression. The remnants of the storm then continued moving northeast through the Southwestern United States. Javier caused no direct fatalities, and the damage in Mexico and the United States was minimal.

Meteorological history

On August 29, a tropical wave moved off the western coast of Africa. It tracked westward across the Atlantic basin, remaining devoid of deep convection—intense shower and thunderstorm activity—for several days. The disturbance interacted with a cold-core low in the vicinity of the Leeward Islands, and both features continued west across the Caribbean Sea. The wave crossed Central America on September 9 as convection steadily increased, and development of thunderstorm activity continued as it entered the East Pacific basin. Despite featuring limited outflow owing to modest easterly wind shear, the system acquired sufficient organization to be deemed a tropical depression around 18:00 UTC on September 10.

Within a few hours of formation, the cyclone began to develop a small central dense overcast-like feature and some associated rainbands. This increase in organization suggested that it strengthened into Tropical Storm Javier around 12:00 UTC on September 11. Over the coming days, a subtropical ridge positioned over Mexico directed Javier on a west-northwest to northwest track offshore the coastline of Mexico. As the storm's convective appearance continued to mature, including the development of an eye and a rainband wrapping throughout the northwestern semicircle, it strengthened into a hurricane around 18:00 UTC on September 12. Javier continued to experience light northeasterly wind shear as it had since the system originally formed, resultant from an upper-level anticyclone focused over the Gulf of California. Javier attained major hurricane—Category 3 or greater on the Saffir–Simpson scale—intensity around 12:00 UTC on September 13, and within 12 hours it reached its peak intensity as a strong Category 4 hurricane.

Early on September 14, Javier's small eye became cloud filled, and imagery of the system's internal structure suggested it was undergoing an eyewall replacement cycle. As this process underfolded but the hurricane otherwise remained within favorable conditions, Javier persisted as a Category 3–4 cyclone until early on September 17. By that time, the storm was entering cooler sea surface temperatures and strong southwesterly wind shear, and those inhibitors were exacerbated by plentiful mid- to upper-level dry air near the cyclone. The system began to lose its associated convective activity, which caused it to weaken under hurricane strength around 12:00 UTC on September 18. Javier was further reduced to a tropical depression within 12 hours. The weakening tropical depression moved onshore Baja California between Cabo San Lázaro and Punta Abreojos around 11:00 UTC on September 19. As it moved north and then north-northeast, it crossed into the Sea of Cortes. Having lacked thunderstorm activity for over 18 hours by that point, the fledging system degenerated to a remnant low around 18:00 UTC that day. The circulation moved into mainland Mexico near Guaymas and dissipated over the mountainous terrain of Sonora on September 20.

Preparations
Javier's strength was difficult to forecast. In its formation stages many of the forecast models gave out a complex suggestions of where the storm should go. One of the models forecast the storm to move west for a couple of days and then stall offshore and then turn east and hit western Guatemala. The rapid intensification was also difficult to forecast compared to average forecast errors in a ten-year period. Mexican officials began issuing tropical storm watches on September 15 as Javier paralleled the west coast of Mexico. The warnings for western mainland Mexico were then dropped as the storm did not recurve as predicted. Forecasters predicted that Javier would bring a storm surge of 1–3 feet, (0.3–1 meters)rainfall of 3-6 inches (7.6-15.2 cm), and strong rip currents. The National Hurricane Center, predicted that Javier will parallel the Baja California coastline according to their forecast models and recurve as a weak storm and dissipate over the Southwestern United States.
On September 18, Mexican officials discontinued the warnings for Baja California when Javier weakened to a tropical depression before making landfall.

Impact

Winds up to tropical storm force were reported by ships at sea. On land, the storm dropped 3.14 inches (80 mm) of rain in Bacanuchi, Mexico. Javier's flooding rains damaged portions of highway 1 near Vizcaino and three fishermen were reported missing when their ship was lost during the storm. In addition, oil prices began to climb when Javier passed through the area. However, overall damage in Baja California was minimal.

In Arizona, the remnants of Javier dropped widespread, light to moderate rainfall, improving topsoil moisture and greatly affecting a prolonged drought in the Southwestern United States. Maximum rainfall in the state reached  in Walnut Creek. In Tucson, the airport received rainfall of 0.37 inches (93 mm) while the University of Arizona reported 0.89 inches (26 mm) of rain. Lightning and rain from Javier delayed the University of Arizona Wildcats football game against the Wisconsin Badgers for 88 minutes late in the second quarter, and flooding closed several roads. Grand Canyon, Arizona received  of rain, exactly one fifth of its yearly average. The remnants of Javier also dropped 1-3 inches of rain across Utah, Colorado, New Mexico, Texas and the upper Midwest. In terms of point maxima, Javier is the rainiest tropical cyclone on record in the period 1972 — 2008 in Wyoming and North Dakota.

See also

Other storms of the same name
Tropical cyclone
List of tropical cyclones
List of historical tropical cyclone names
List of wettest tropical cyclones in Arizona
Timeline of the 2004 Pacific hurricane season
List of Category 4 Pacific hurricanes

External links

Damage photo

References

Javier
Javier (2004)
Javier (2004)
Javier (2004)
Javier (2004)
Javier (2004)
Javier (2004)
2004 natural disasters in the United States
2004 in Mexico
Javier
Javier